Oi Vasiliades ("the Kings") was a Greek-language  daily family-comedy telenovela produced by Greece's Mega Channel and premiere January 8, 2012. The series is based on the Argentinian series Los Roldan creation of Adriana Lorenzon and Mario Schajris. The screenplay adaptation was undertaken by Vicky Alexopoulou, Giorgos Chryssovitsanos, Kostas Kalafatis and Kostas Kaponis, and directed by Pierros Andrakakos, Nick Kritikos and Stamos Tsamis. The series ended temporarily (due to problems between production and channel) after 81 episodes on June 8, 2012

The series resumed November 2013 and ran until December 19.

Cast

Kostas Koklas — Markos Vasilias
Gerasimos Skiadaresis — Aimilios Kanellopoulos
Martha Karagianni — Eugenia Palaiologou
Vasiliki Andritsou — Giouli Skouloudi
Zeta Douka — Christina Rozaki
Alexandra Palaiologou — Titika Vlaxou-Kanellopoulou
Mina Orfanou — Lampis/Liza Vasilia
Panos Vlaxos — Leonidas Vasilias
Katerina Geronikou — Nefeli Malea
Nelson Protopapas † — Alexis Kanellopoulos
Nikos Anadiotis — Minas Kapatos
Aggelina Paraskeuaidi — Marina Vasilia
Eugenia Tsaousi — Sofi Kapatou
Melina Spetsieri — Stella Vasilia
Manos Ioannou — Stauros
Sokratis Patsikas — Patroklos
Christos Sapountzis — Tryfonas Maleas
Vivian Kontomari — Despoina
Eva Laskari — Tatiana Rousou
Panagiotis Petrakis — Stefanos Aygeris
Isavella Vlasiadou — Deby
Dimitris Liolios — Sotiris Xaros
Ilias Makras — Xaris Vasilias
Thodoros Romanidis — Papadakis
Konstantina Klapsinou — Sabrina
Vivi Nikolakopoulou — Toula
Maria Myriokefalitaki — Myrsini

International release

References 
The information in this article is based on that in its Greek equivalent.

External links

Mega Channel original programming
2012 Greek television series debuts
2012 Greek television series endings
2010s Greek television series
Greek television soap operas